The Oberon class was a ship class of 27 British-designed submarines operated by five different nations. They were designed as a direct follow-on from the Porpoise class: physical dimensions were the same, but stronger materials were used in hull construction, and updated equipment was fitted.

The submarines were built between 1957 and 1978 by four shipyards: Cammell Laird (4), Chatham Dockyard (6), Scotts Shipbuilding and Engineering Company (11) and Vickers-Armstrongs (6). Thirteen of the submarines were operated by the Royal Navy, six by the Royal Australian Navy, three by the Brazilian Navy, three by the Royal Canadian Navy/Canadian Forces Maritime Command (plus two ex-Royal Navy boats later acquired for non-commissioned roles), and two by the Chilean Navy.

The Oberons operated during the height of the Cold War, with duties including surveillance, tracking of other ships and submarines, delivery and retrieval of special forces personnel, and serving as targets for anti-submarine training. Submarines of the class were in service until 2000. As of 2015, eight of the submarines are preserved intact as museum vessels, another three are partially preserved (with some exterior portions of the submarine on display), and one is in private ownership and awaiting conversion for display. The rest have been sold for scrap, including one former museum vessel.

See also
 List of submarines of the Royal Navy

Footnotes

References

 
Oberon-class submarine